After You're Gone is a 2016 Russian comedy-drama film directed by Anna Matison.

Plot
Famous ballet dancer Alexey Temnikov (Sergey Bezrukov) dedicated his whole life to the stage, performing in various halls around the world. The press referred to him as "genius of dance" and compared him with Mikhail Baryshnikov.

But in the 1990s, Temnikov suffered a serious spinal injury, which interrupted his dancing career. Alexey returned to his native town in the suburbs with a population of 70 thousand people and opened his own dance school-studio and an apothecary business.

After 20 years, Alexey's life does not change, he still lives in his hometown, where he teaches dance. He has a girlfriend named Marina (Karina Andolenko), who is pregnant with his child. Also, Alexey finds out that he has a 12-year-old daughter Chiara, who wants Alexey to teach her dance. But Alexey does not show any initiative in marriage or being a father. After teaching his dance classes, Alexey locks himself up in his office, where he regularly asks himself: "What will be left from me after I'm gone?".

But soon the old trauma, once again makes itself felt. He finds out that soon he will not even be able to walk, which to Alexey is the same as death.

Sometime ago he created an original ballet set to Prokofiev's music, but did not yet have the courage make a public performance out of it. Alexey becomes convinced that now is the time for him to make a comeback and to stage the ballet.

Cast

Sergey Bezrukov as Alexey Germanovich Temnikov
Aliza Rajan as Poppy
Anastasia Bezrukova as Chiara
Alyona Babenko as mother of Chiara
Karina Andolenko as Marina Kuznetsova ("The Desman")
Vladimir Menshov as Herman Temnikov, father of Alexey
Maria Smolnikova as Alisa
Tamara Akulova as Lyubov Temnikova, Alexey's mother
Stepan Kulikov as Stepan
Galina Bokashevskaya as teacher
Sergey Vershinin as Vladislav
Valery Gergiev as cameo
Radu Poklitaru as cameo
Alla Duhova as cameo
Dmitry Khrustalev as cameo
Vyacheslav Kulaev as judge on the show
Sergei Gazarov as doctor from Moscow
Vitaly Egorov as Nikolai Martynov, director of the Bolshoi Theater
Alexander Sivaev as artist
Kirill Kroshman-Klimov as foreman

References

External links

2016 films
2016 comedy-drama films
Russian comedy-drama films
Films about ballet
2010s Russian-language films